Nová Ves u Bakova is a municipality and village in Mladá Boleslav District in the Central Bohemian Region of the Czech Republic. It has about 300 inhabitants.

Gallery

References

Villages in Mladá Boleslav District